Bloodsports is the sixth studio album by English alternative rock band Suede. It was released on 18 March 2013, via Warner Bros. Records. It is their first studio album since A New Morning in 2002.

The album was the first since Coming Up to be produced by their longtime producer Ed Buller, and also the first album to feature keyboardist Neil Codling since his departure in 2001.

Background and production
Frontman Brett Anderson commented that the album would sound like a cross between Dog Man Star and Coming Up. He stated that Bloodsports is "about lust, it's about the chase, it's about the endless carnal game of love. It was possibly the hardest we've ever made but certainly the most satisfying".

The band performed new material in 2011, most of which got scrapped when they went into the studio with Ed Buller, the producer of their first three albums.

Release
In January 2013, Suede released a free download of opening track "Barriers". The lead single, "It Starts and Ends with You", followed in February. Second single "Hit Me" was released 27 May. Third single "For the Strangers" was released in October on the same day the band released The Vinyl Collection, a box set of the band's six studio albums and b-side collection on vinyl. Bloodsports debuted on the Official UK Albums Chart at number 10, on first-week sales of 10,453 copies. It went on to sell 22,410 units after 12 weeks. A 7-inch double a-side of "Barriers"/"Animal Nitrate" was released 20 April on Record Store Day.

Critical reception

Bloodsports has been very well received by critics, their most acclaimed album since Coming Up in 1996. At Metacritic, which assigns a rating out of 100 to reviews from mainstream critics, the album received an average score of 80, based on 29 reviews, indicating "generally favourable reviews."

Year-end lists
Bloodsports has been included in many Best Albums of 2013 lists including:

Track listing

Personnel

Suede
Brett Anderson – vocals
Richard Oakes – guitars
Simon Gilbert – drums
Mat Osman – electric bass
Neil Codling – synthesisers, guitars

Technical
Ed Buller – production, engineering
Andy Hughes – engineering
Paul-Édouard Laurendeau – engineering
Joel M. Peters – engineering assistance
Andy Wallace – mixing
Paul Suarez – Pro Tools engineering
Howie Weinberg – mastering
Dan Gerbarg – mastering

Artwork
Jonathan Baron – cover
Matthew Holroyd – cover
Brett Anderson – cover
Mat Osman – cover
Blommers/Schumm – artwork photography
Roger Sargent – band photography
Studio-Baron – design

Charts

References

External links

Bloodsports at YouTube (streamed copy where licensed)
 

2013 albums
Suede (band) albums
Albums produced by Ed Buller
Warner Records albums